Leposternon maximus is a worm lizard species in the family Amphisbaenidae. It is endemic to Brazil.

References

Leposternon
Reptiles of Brazil
Endemic fauna of Brazil
Reptiles described in 2011
Taxa named by Síria Ribeiro
Taxa named by Cristiano Nogueira
Taxa named by Carlos Eduardo D. Cintra
Taxa named by Nelson Jorge Da Silva Jr.
Taxa named by Hussam Zaher